Allyson Clay (born 1953) is a Canadian visual artist, curator, and educator based in Vancouver, B.C.

Life 
Clay was born in Vancouver, British Columbia. in 1953, and spent much of her childhood and adolescence in Italy. She obtained a B.F.A. in Painting from the Nova Scotia College of Art and Design in 1980 and an M.F.A. from the University of British Columbia in 1985. She is a professor at the School of the Contemporary Arts at Simon Fraser University.

Artistic practice 
Clay has an interdisciplinary artistic practice that encompasses photography, painting, and installation. Her artwork has often examined "the problematic, contradictory nature of contemporary urbanism" through "experiments with conceptual theory and traditional colour." Clay's artistic research draws upon work by feminist writer and scholar Donna Haraway, and American artist Mary Kelly. Clay looks at the role of "women through the city, through the social, and through the history of art making." Her artwork has been exhibited at Canadian galleries including the Vancouver Art Gallery and the Banff Centre for the Arts. Clay is represented by Costin and Klentworth Gallery in Toronto. Clay's work is in several public collections including the Morris and Helen Belkin Art Gallery, the Museum of Contemporary Canadian Art, and the University of Lethbridge Art Gallery. Canadian artist Arnaud Magg's described Clay as one of the best practising artists in Canada.

Selected exhibitions 
 2018 Beginning with the Seventies: GLUT, Jan 12 - April 9, Morris and Helen Belkin Art Gallery, Vancouver, BC.
 2009 Mall/Flip, Jan 17 – Feb 18, Leo Kamen Gallery, Toronto, ON.
 2004 The shadow of Production, Vancouver Art Gallery, Vancouver, BC.
 2002 Imaginary Standard Distance, Walter Phillips Gallery, Banff, AB.
 1995 Allyson Clay and Shonagh Alexander, Contemporary Art Gallery, Vancouver, BC.
 1992 Traces of a City in the Spaces Between Some People, Charles H. Scott Gallery, Vancouver, BC.
 1988 LURE, Artspeak Gallery, Vancouver, BC.
 1985 Hold It, Western Front Gallery, Vancouver, BC.

Grants 
Clay has received grants from the Canadian Council for the Arts, the BC Arts Council, and the Rockefeller Foundation Bellagio Residency Program.

References 

Artists from Vancouver
1953 births
Living people
20th-century Canadian artists
20th-century Canadian women artists
21st-century Canadian artists
NSCAD University alumni
University of British Columbia alumni
Academic staff of Simon Fraser University
Canadian women curators